Éber Alejandro Moas Silveira (born 21 March 1969) is a Uruguayan former footballer who played as a defender. He obtained 48 caps for his national team from 1988 to 1997.

Club career

Moas started his playing career in 1988 with Danubio. He joined Club Atlético Independiente of Argentina in 1992 where he played 65 games.

In 1995, he joined América de Cali of Colombia and in 1996 he went to Mexico to play for Monterrey.

In 1998 Moas returned to Danubio where he played until 2002. In 2005, he joined Racing Club de Montevideo and in 2007 he played for Rentistas.

References

  Profile

1969 births
Living people
Uruguayan footballers
Association football defenders
Footballers from Montevideo
Uruguay international footballers
1991 Copa América players
1993 Copa América players
1995 Copa América players
1997 Copa América players
Danubio F.C. players
Club Atlético Independiente footballers
Esporte Clube Vitória players
Expatriate footballers in Argentina
Expatriate footballers in Brazil
Expatriate footballers in Colombia
Uruguayan expatriate sportspeople in Argentina
Uruguayan expatriate sportspeople in Brazil
Uruguayan expatriate sportspeople in Colombia
Uruguayan expatriate sportspeople in Mexico
América de Cali footballers
C.F. Monterrey players
Racing Club de Montevideo players
C.A. Rentistas players
Uruguayan Primera División players
Argentine Primera División players
Categoría Primera A players
Uruguayan expatriate footballers
Expatriate footballers in Mexico
Copa América-winning players